Coast Guard Base Ketchikan is a major shore installation of the United States Coast Guard located in Ketchikan, Alaska. The base is a homeport for two Sentinel-class cutters and a buoy tender, and is the only Coast Guard dry dock in the state. Located one mile south of the city's downtown area along the southwestern shore of Revillagigedo Island, the base was originally established in 1920 to support the United States Lighthouse Service and became part of the Coast Guard in 1940. In addition to the homeported cutters, Base Ketchikan's maintenance facilities support forward-deployed cutters throughout Southeast Alaska, in Petersburg, Juneau and Sitka.

Coast Guard Station Ketchikan 
Coast Guard Station Ketchikan is a tenant unit on Coast Guard Base Ketchikan, equipped with 47-foot motor lifeboats and the Response Boat-Medium. It is one of three Coast Guard small-boat stations in Alaska.

Homeported cutters 
 USCGC Bailey T. Barco - Sentinel-class cutter
 USCGC John F. McCormick - Sentinel-class cutter
USCGC Anthony Petit (WLM-558) - Keeper-class buoy tender

References

External links 
Coast Guard Base Ketchikan - official site
Coast Guard Station Ketchikan - official site

Buildings and structures in Ketchikan Gateway Borough, Alaska
Military installations in Alaska
United States Coast Guard bases
Ketchikan, Alaska
1920 establishments in Alaska